Opaliński (plural Opalińscy) was the name of an old and notable Polish noble family which produced one Queen Consort of Poland.

History 
They originated from the town of Opalenica and used the Coat of arms of Łodzia. They were powerful players in the politics of Poland in the 16th and 17th centuries. One branch of the family hailed from Sieraków.

Notable members 
Its notable members included:
 Jan Opaliński (1546–1598), father of
 Jan Opaliński (1581–1637)
 Piotr Opaliński (1586–1624), father of
 Krzysztof Opaliński (1611–1655), father of 
 Jan Karol Opaliński (1642–1695), father of
 Katarzyna Opaliński (1680–1747), Queen consort of Poland
 Łukasz Opaliński (1612–1666)
Łukasz Opaliński (1581–1654)

Coat of arms

Palaces

Gallery

Family tree

See also
 Opalenica
 Krzeszowice
 Rytwiany
 Tuliszków

Bibliography 
 Historia Polski. Bóg, Honor, Ojczyzna. Kompendium wiedzy dla całej rodziny. nr 132